Ehab Fuad Ahmed Nagi (17 September 1968) is a former South Yemen athlete, who competed at the 1988 Summer Olympic Games in the men's 100m, he finished 8th in his heat and failed to advance.

References

External links
 

Athletes (track and field) at the 1988 Summer Olympics
1968 births
Yemeni male sprinters
Living people
Olympic athletes of South Yemen
20th-century Yemeni people